St John Fisher School or St John Fisher College may refer to:

Secondary and high schools
 The John Fisher School in Purley, Surrey, England 
 St John Fisher Catholic College in Newcastle-under-Lyme, Staffordshire, England
 St John Fisher Catholic High School, Harrogate in North Yorkshire, England
 St John Fisher Catholic High School, Peterborough in Cambridgeshire, England
 St John Fisher Catholic High School, Wigan in Greater Manchester, England
 St John Fisher Catholic School in Chatham, Kent, England
 St John Fisher Catholic Voluntary Academy in Dewsbury, West Yorkshire, England
 Ss John Fisher and Thomas More Roman Catholic High School in Colne, Lancashire
 St. John Fisher Ibanda Secondary School in Ibanda, Uganda

Higher education
 St. John Fisher College, private liberal arts college in Rochester, New York, United States
 St. John Fisher College (University of Tasmania) in Tasmania, Australia
 St. John Fisher Seminary Residence in Stamford, Connecticut, United States

Other
 St. John Fisher College, New York (CDP), census-designated place encompassing the St. John Fisher College campus